The Novosibirsk Rail Bridge is a single-track railway bridge across the Ob River. Originally constructed as part of the Trans-Siberian Railway mainline, the bridge was narrow, with only one track. It was designed by Nikolai Belelubsky and built in between 1893 and 1897. The location of the bridge was selected by Nikolai Garin-Mikhailovsky. It is believed that the decision to start the bridge's construction near the village of Krivoschekovo led to the foundation of Novosibirsk.

Selecting a place to cross the Ob River 

Choosing a building site for the future bridge has proven to be a difficult task. According to the original plan, the railway line was expected to be routed through the town of Tomsk. This entailed the bridge's construction about 55 km to the west of Tomsk, at the place where the Ob had always swollen with spring meltwater. It was not suitable for construction and meant that a new location needed to be chosen. This work is generally understood to be done by Nikolai Garin-Mikhailovsky (known not only as a prominent civil engineer, but also as a writer). He proposed to choose a narrow site with rocky outcrops on the surface that was situated about 200 km southwest of Tomsk. Nowadays it is known as a city of Novosibirsk. It was just beyond the north extremity the Salair Ridge.

In late August of 1891, a plenary meeting of three major state officials took place in the Big Krivoschekovo village. The participants included Head of Department of construction of railways Konstantin Mikhailovsky, State Counsellor Vladimir Berezin (future contractor), as well as Commander of exploration group Vikenti-Ignatsy Royetski. They examined the hydrographic data submitted by Royetski and took their final decision to recommend a place for the future bridge crossing, where a local cattle wade was situated. That is how the building location for the future bridge was chosen.

Construction and initial design 

Responsibility for the design of this first railway bridge was assigned to the accomplished civil engineer Prof. Nikolai Belelubsky, a well-known Russian scientist in the field of structural mechanics and engineering, who developed the projects for a great variety of bridges in the Russian Empire.

The bridge's superstructure provided originally for nine 109-meter (358 ft.) bowstring arch through truss spans over the river channel, with double lattice girders. This design involved a thorough alignment of the top and floor members (chords) and the members between the chords (web members) that were fabricated 
of open-hearth steel. 

Belelubsky also applied his own innovative constructive solution called the 'free carriageway' that used pin connected members in a freely chosen angle. This design allowed to shorten the length of panels making the structural frames easier and reducing secondary stresses in the truss members. The presence of vertical load-bearing members greatly simplified the design of cradles, base frames and structural connections used in the trusses. Such a type of connecting method was considered to be groundbreaking in the days of Belelubsky, hence it received a gold medal at the Edinburg Exposition 1890 and later came to be known as the 'Russian type of design'.

The bridge was built entirely of open-hearth steel, a newly developed material at the time of construction. Steelwork elements used in the bridge superstructure amounting to 4423 tons were fabricated at the famous Votkinsk ironworks in Udmurtia under the supervision of the prolific contractor General V.I. Berezin.

The truss superstructure was set on masonry piers that were reinforced by triangular buttresses (cutwaters) pointing upstream to break up ice that floats downstream in spring. The clear head room was 17 metres (56 ft.) above mean high water. 

The bridge was under construction for 4 years, and the installation expenses were about 2 million rubles. In 1896, load tests were carried out on the bridge, during which 4 steam locomotives crossed over the bridge and it was solemnly opened to traffic on March 31, 1897. A pedestrian path was opened on the bridge, for this purpose wooden sidewalks were made (but subsequently the movement of pedestrians was forbidden).

All stages of the construction were managed by civil engineer G.M.Budagov. He remembered with gratitude his cooperation with Nikolai Garin-Mikhailovsky when constructing the railway section, bridge and station. Here's what he told: "The activity of our witty, talented and excellent comrade Nikolai G.Garin-Mikhailovsky has made the internal life of the builders and their work some especially colourful and pleasant."

Development and operation 

In the 1930s, after the opening of the double-track Komsomolsky (KIMovsky) rail bridge and a new freight train bypass, the 'old' bridge lost its significance to some extent and started to be used, as a rule, for passenger trains transiting through the city center.

In April 1984, a new truss superstructure separate from the original carriageway was erected on the piers of the 'old' bridge by the construction crew No.429 of the Western Siberian Railway. It was fabricated of 15.7 thousand steelwork elements, amounting to 4.5 thousand tons. Reconstruction began in 1974. For this purpose, approaches were made, composed of 78 thousand cubic metres of soil, and on them a road was laid, leading to the left-bank abutment for delivering metal, concrete and other building materials to the construction site. For estimating the actual condition of the existing piers, a group of experts from Leningrad visually inspected, physically sampled and tested components of masonry assemblies and foundations on bedrock. It was concluded that it would be feasible to install new spans on the same piers. The Ministry of Railways of the USSR took the decision to install the new superstructure with subsequent dismantling of the old one, as it was not strong enough for present day loads, because it was designed for the small locomotives and light carriages. 

With the launch of a new Novosibirsk hydroelectric power plant, annual spring ice drifting has become not so intense in and around the city, and so the function of the cutwaters was no longer relevant. The bridge builders erected seven ferroconcrete supports (pylons) on the foundations of the former cutwaters and constructed two new abutments. The installation of 100 metres long trusses between the piers was carried out by the balanced cantilever method (from pier to pier) with the use of cranes passing through the top and inside of the trusses. 

In 1991, all traffic over the old bridge was halted, and its dismantling began in 2000. The new trusses were assembled with the use of high-strength bolts that allowed to quickly install them without scaffolding or any floating means. The new spans were stronger and larger, but less attractive than the old openwork trusses that had well served for almost a century on the great Trans-Siberian Way. 

By now, all the old trusses have been displaced and the bridge reverted to a single track operation. However, the piers and abutments of the 'old' bridge still exist that allows the bridge to be widened to double-track, if necessary. Besides, one of the old spans has been kept as a museum piece on the riverside promenade of the city.

See also

Nikolai Belelubsky
Ufa Rail Bridge
Trans-Siberian Railway

References

Notes

Sources 
 Баландин С.Н. Железнодорожный мост через Обь(недоступная ссылка) // Новосибирск. История градостроительства 1893-1945 гг. - Новосибирск: Западно-сибирское книжное издательство, 1978. - 136 с. 
 Баландин С.Н. Новосибирск. История градостроительства 1945-1985 гг. - Новосибирск: Западно-сибирское книжное издательство, 1986. - 160 с.
 Власов Г.М. Первый железнодорожный мост через Обь (Изыскания, проектирование, строительство). - Новосибирск: Изд-во СГУПСа (НИИЖТа). - 36 с.
 Невзгодин И.В. Архитектура Новосибирска. - Новосибирск: СО РАН, 2005. - С. 20-21. - 204 с. - .

External links 
The first railroad bridge over the River Ob' 
The Trans Siberian railway bridge over the Ob river at Novosibirsk, Siberia, Russia
Stock Photo - the Trans Siberian railway bridge over the Ob river at Novosibirsk, Siberia, Russia

Buildings and structures in Novosibirsk Oblast
Buildings and structures in Siberia
Railway bridges in Russia
Bridges over the Ob River
R
Truss bridges
1893 establishments
Rail transport in Novosibirsk Oblast